Bitte schön! (If you please!), opus 372, is a polka composed by Johann Strauss II. The first two themes of the composition incorporate Strauss' operetta Cagliostro in Wien. The composition was first performed in the summer of 1872.

References

Compositions by Johann Strauss II
Polkas
1872 compositions